Burbank Unified School District is a school district headquartered in Burbank, California, United States.

History

Originally students attended Burbank schools until the high school level, when they moved on to Glendale Union High School District. The Burbank school district established its first high school, Burbank High School, in 1908, and therefore withdrew from the Glendale High School district.

The district passed a general obligation bond in the 1950s.

In 1992 the Brighton Community School, a school for students with disciplinary programs, moved to a site adjacent to the BUSD headquarters, on a  property. In 1998 BUSD sold the property to the city government for $8 million. The city planned to build a park and a library branch on this land. The district planned to move the Burbank school on the same site as Monterey High School, a school for students with academic problems, but by August 1998 the district withdrew these plans due to a negative response from area residents.

In March 1993 the district board voted 5–0 to approve random metal detector searches of middle and high school students.

In April 1994 the district failed to pass a $100-million bond. Superintendent Arthur Pierce resigned in May of that year. The district successfully passed a $112 million bond in 1997, the first-such bond passed since the 1950s.

In August 2015 Matt Hill, previously a chief strategy officer at the Los Angeles Unified School District, became the district superintendent of BUSD.

In November 2015 the district approved board starting the following school year during the third week of August.

In April 2019, the district board voted unanimously to rename the David Starr Jordan Middle School due to David Starr Jordan's involvement with the eugenics movement. The middle school kept Jordan's name for the next two years while the school district searched for a replacement name that everyone could agree with. In March 2021, the district board finally decided to rename their middle school in honor of labor leader and civil rights activist Dolores Huerta.

On September 9, 2020, the school district removed Harper Lee's To Kill a Mockingbird, Mark Twain's Adventures of Huckleberry Finn, John Steinbeck's Of Mice and Men, Theodore Taylor's The Cay and Mildred D. Taylor's Roll of Thunder, Hear My Cry from middle school and high school whole class instruction after complaints were received from four parents of students. The decision gained the attention of anti-censorship organizations such as PEN America and the National Coalition Against Censorship who object the banning of these books from the classroom.

Governing Board

Burbank Unified School District's Governing Board is composed of five members, elected to a four-year term. Elections were held at the same time as the Burbank City Council elections with the primary in late February and the runoff in mid-April of odd-numbered years. The school board voted to eliminate the primary/runoff format and replace with a plurality election and moved its Governing Board elections to the first Tuesday after the first Monday in November effective with the 2020 election to coincide with the California general election. Board members whose terms expire in April 2019, will extend to December 2020 and members whose terms expire in April 2021 will extend to December 2022.

Schools

High schools
 Burbank High School
 John Burroughs High School
 Monterey High School (Continuation)

Middle schools
 John Muir Middle School
 Luther Burbank Middle School
 Dolores Huerta Middle School

Elementary schools

 Walt Disney Elementary School
 Thomas Edison Elementary School
 Ralph Emerson Elementary School
 Bret Harte Elementary School
 Thomas Jefferson Elementary School
 William McKinley Elementary School
 Joaquin Miller Elementary School
 Providencia Elementary School
 Theodore Roosevelt Elementary School
 R.L. Stevenson Elementary School
 George Washington Elementary School

Other schools
Burbank Adult School
Community Day School
Magnolia Park School
Horace Mann Children's Center

Former schools
 Abraham Lincoln Elementary School
 Henry M. Mingay Elementary School (Now Burbank Adult School)
 Monterey Elementary School (Now Monterey Continuation High School)
 Benjamin Franklin Elementary School
Horace Mann Elementary School (Now Horace Mann Children's Center)
 John Quincy Adams Middle School (Now Thomas Edison Elementary School)

References

External links

 Burbank Unified School District
Burbank Schools on Burbank.com
Articles about "Burbank Unified School District" at the Los Angeles Times